Joseph Li Mingshu (1 December 1924 – 15 June 2018) was a Chinese clandestine Catholic bishop.

Bishop Li was born in village Lijia, Shandong in a Catholic family on December 1, 1924. He joined the theological seminary after a school and a minor seminary education and was ordained a priest on April 11, 1949. He worked as a teacher in the schools and theologian seminaries. From 1994 he served as an Administrator of the Roman Catholic Diocese of Qingdao and later was clandestinely consecrated as a diocesan bishop of the same diocese on August 13, 2000. He served as bishop here until his death. Bishop Li was recognised by the Chinese government but never joined the Chinese Patriotic Catholic Association.

References

1924 births
2018 deaths
People from Binzhou
21st-century Roman Catholic bishops in China